Ardsallagh Goat Farm is located at Carrigtwohill, County Cork. Three types of cheese are made from their own herd and from locally sourced goat's milk.  The cheeses are suitable for vegetarians.

Products
 Ardsallagh Natural Goats Yogurt
 Ardsallagh Cranberry Roulade
 Ardsallagh Soft Goat's Cheese - aged from 4 days to 6 weeks.
 Ardsallagh Hard Goat's Cheese - aged for 3 months
 Ardsallagh Smoked Cheese - aged for 3 months

Awards
 Irish Cheese awards 2011. Gold - Cranberry Roulade
 British Cheese Awards 2011.
 Silver - smoked cheese.
 Bronze - soft cheese.
 British Cheese awards 2010
Bronze - Cranberry Roulade
Silver - Smoked goats cheese
 British Cheese awards 2005. Gold - Honey Mustard Goats Cheese

See also
 List of goat milk cheeses

References

Further reading

External links
 Official website of Ardsallagh Goat Farm

Dairy products companies of Ireland
Cheesemakers
Goat's-milk cheeses